Events from the year 1934 in art.

Events
April – David Low's cartoon character Colonel Blimp first appears in the London Evening Standard.
April 10 – The Just Judges, a panel of the Ghent Altarpiece painted by Jan van Eyck or his brother Hubert between 1430–32, is stolen from St Bavo's Cathedral, Ghent, Belgium. In November, on his deathbed, Arsène Goedertier admits to the theft but most of the panel is never recovered.
August 31 – John Smiukse destroys the mural Nightmare of 1934 in Tarrytown, New York.
Publication in the United States of Irving Stone's biographical novel of Vincent van Gogh, Lust for Life.

Works

Eileen Agar – The Autobiography of an Embryo
Hans Arp – Human Concretion (Musée National d'Art Moderne, Paris)
Balthus – Guitar Lesson
Paul Cadmus
Coney Island
The Fleet's In!
Greenwich Village Cafeteria
Salvador Dalí – The Ghost of Vermeer of Delft Which Can Be Used As a Table
Edwin Dickinson – Stranded Brig
Antonio Donghi – Canzone
Raoul Dufy – Regatta at Cowes  (National Gallery of Art, Washington D.C.)
Jacob Epstein – Portrait bust of George Bernard Shaw
M. C. Escher – Still Life with Spherical Mirror (lithograph)
Leo Friedlander – marble reliefs outside Oregon State Capitol
Covered Wagon
Lewis and Clark
Lily Furedi – The Subway
Edward Hopper – East Wind Over Weehawken
Paul Manship – Prometheus (gilded bronze sculpture, Rockefeller Center, New York City)
Joan Miró – Woman
Ronald Moody – Wohin (carved oak head)
Ben Nicholson – 1934 (relief)
José Clemente Orozco – The Epic of American Civilization (mural, Dartmouth College, New Hampshire, 1932-34)
Pablo Picasso – Minotauromachy
Diego Rivera – Man, Controller of the Universe (mural, Palacio de Bellas Artes, Mexico City)
Raphael Soyer – How Long Since You Wrote to Mother?

Exhibitions
April - The Unit One group holds its only exhibition, in Cork Street (London), accompanied by a book, Unit 1: the Modern Movement in English Architecture, Painting and Sculpture, edited by Herbert Read.

Awards
Archibald Prize: Henry Hanke – Self Portrait
Légion d'honneur: Gen Paul

Births
January 18 – Raymond Briggs, English illustrator (d. 2022)
February 11 – Mary Quant, English fashion designer
February 26
Frank Bowling, Guyanese-born painter
José Luis Cuevas, Mexican artist (d. 2017)
February 27 – Vincent Fourcade, French interior designer (d. 1992)
March 1 – Jean-Michel Folon, Belgian sculptor (d. 2005)
March 7 – Gray Morrow, American comic book artist and book illustrator (d. 2001)
March 20 – Eric Hebborn, English art forger (d. 1996)
April 16 – Vicar, Chilean comic book artist
May 29 – Jef Geys, Belgian artist (d. 2018) 
June 15 – Aron Tager, American-Canadian actor, voice actor and artist
June 18 – Dimitris Mytaras, Greek painter (d. 2017)
June 20 – Rius, Mexican cartoonist
July 11 – Giorgio Armani, Italian fashion designer
July 18 – Jean-Michel Sanejouand, French painter and sculptor (d. 2021)
July 24 – Lee Friedlander, American photographer
August 14 – Lucien Clergue, French photographer (d. 2014)
September 14 – Kate Millett, American sculptor and feminist activist (d. 2017)
October 14 – Rose Wylie, English painter
December 28 – Alasdair Gray, Scottish fiction writer and artist (d. 2019)
date unknown
Sheila Hicks, American-born textile artist
Neil Williams, American painter (d. 1988)

Deaths
 March 23 – Wenzel Hablik, German painter, graphic artist and designer (b. 1881)
 March 28 – Mahmoud Mokhtar, Egyptian sculptor (b. 1891)
 April 11 – John Collier, English Pre-Raphaelite painter (b. 1850)
 June 29 – Adolf Kašpar, Czech painter and illustrator (b. 1877)
 July 1 – Jules Monge, French painter (b. 1855)
 August 17 – Aleksandr Borisov, Russian Arctic landscape painter (b. 1866)
 September 1 – Yumeji Takehisa, Japanese poet and painter (b. 1884)
 October 11 – M. O. Hammond, Canadian photographer (b. 1876)
 October 12 – Gertrude Käsebier, American portrait photographer (b. 1852)
 October 17 – Adolf Hölzel, German painter of an Impressionism to expressive modernism style (b. 1853)
 November 4 – Sir Alfred Gilbert, English sculptor (b. 1854)
 December 4 – Paul-Albert Besnard, French painter (b. 1849)
 December 28 – Pablo Gargallo, Spanish painter and sculptor (b. 1881)
 date unknown – Alfred Boucher, French sculptor (b. 1850)

See also 
 1934 in fine arts of the Soviet Union

References

 
Years of the 20th century in art
1930s in art